Patel v Ali [1984] Ch 283 is an English contract law case, concerning the possibility of claiming specific performance of a promise after breach of contract.

Facts
A vendor of a house became disabled after the sale. If she went through with the sale she would have lost the house. The buyer of the house demanded specific performance to convey the property.

Judgment
Goulding J refused to grant specific performance, and granted only damages. As a discretionary, equitable remedy, specific performance was refused on the ground that considerable hardship would be caused.

See also

English contract law
Sky Petroleum v VIP Petroleum [1974] 1 WLR 576
Restatement (Second) of Contracts 1979 §364

Notes

References

English contract case law
High Court of Justice cases
1985 in case law
1985 in British law